The Rough Guide to Dub is a world music compilation album originally released in 2005. Part of the World Music Network Rough Guides series, the release covers the roots of dub music, focusing on the period 1973-1980. Curation was performed by Steve Barrow, co-founder of the record label Blood and Fire, who also compiled The Rough Guide to Reggae and authored its companion book. Phil Stanton, co-founder of the World Music Network, produced the work.

Critical reception

The album received universal acclaim upon release. Writing for PopMatters, John Bergstrom described it as "the most essential single-disc, multi-artist collection of dub music to be issued to date." Bergstrom's observation that King Tubby and his circle dominate the track-listing was echoed by XLR8R's Jesse Serwer.  In the same vein, Rick Anderson of AllMusic pointed out that the tracks come from the vaults of re-issuing label Blood and Fire, causing the album to overlook artists like Augustus Pablo and Scientist, but nonetheless recommended the album. Robert Christgau hit the same note, calling it "less inclusive than the title suggests", but praised the accessibility, a point mirrored by the Sydney Morning Herald's Bruce Elder, who also applauded the recording's "edginess" and "richness".

Track listing

References

External links
 

2005 compilation albums
World Music Network Rough Guide albums